William Crain (born May 17, 2000) is an American soccer player who plays for the South Carolina Gamecocks .

Career 
Crain played with Atlanta United FC academy whilst also appearing for Atlanta's United Soccer League affiliate Atlanta United 2 during their inaugural season in 2018.

Crain announced his intention to play college soccer at Brown University from 2018 onward.

References

External links

2000 births
Living people
American soccer players
Association football defenders
Atlanta United 2 players
Brown Bears men's soccer players
Soccer players from Georgia (U.S. state)
USL Championship players